Altenia modesta is a moth of the family Gelechiidae. It is found in Bulgaria, Croatia, Greece, Albania, Armenia, Kyrgyzstan and Algeria.

The wingspan is about 16 mm.

The larvae feed on Pistacia vera.

References

Moths described in 1955
Altenia
Moths of Europe
Moths of Asia
Moths of Africa